Edward Soja uses the term fractal city to describe the "metropolarities" and the restructured social mosaic of today's urban landscape or "postmetropolis". In his book, Postmetropolis: Critical Studies of Cities and Regions, he discusses how the contemporary American city has become far more complex than the familiar upper class vs. middle class or black vs. white models of society. It has become a fractal city of intensified inequalities and social polarization. The term "fractal" gives it the idea of having a fractured social geometry. This is a patterning of metropolarities, or an intensification of socio-economic inequalities, some of which Soja tries to pinpoint and discuss.

Topics

The Removal of Distance
William Wilson's location theory tries to give an explanation for the widening poverty and inequality gap. With rise of new technologies in recent decades, the new communication methods have allowed us to process and transmit information over great distances. This has, in a sense, destroyed distance. Distance no longer hinders communication as much as it used to. As a result, many businesses have relocated out of the inner city to the suburbs. Sadly, this leaves many ethnic communities stranded in the deindustrialized inner city. They are unable to take part in the sudden shift to information-based and service-based industry jobs. Both Edward Soja and Saskia Sassen have written on this.

Mono-Ethnic Geographies
Soja uses Los Angeles as evidence that social inequalities and polarizations in American society have in fact been increasing, which partly due to globalization and economic restructuring. He describes the "ethnic quilt" of L.A., "a heterogeneous mosaic of new and old ethnicities". In this, he discusses ethnic niches as well as segregated cityspace, the spatial or geographical concentration of ethnic groups in L.A. Many parts of Los Angeles have experienced rapid demographic transformations in recent decades. Some neighborhoods have been "shifting from 80 percent white in 1965 to, in many areas, over 90 percent Latino today." Soja concludes by stating that "... Los Angeles remains one of the most segregated urban regions in the country."

Nevertheless, there are places that show exceptional ethnic diversity and equality, such as the cities of Gardena and Carson in Los Angeles County that have had a perfectly even mix of white, black, Latino, and Asian percentages.

End Note
Soja urges us, in political struggles, to look beyond the simple equality politics of class, race and gender. Instead, we should look to "more cross-cutting and inclusive foundations of solidarity, collective consciousness, and coalition building".

References
Allen, James P., and Eugene Turner 1997:The Ethnic Quilt: Population Diversity in Southern California. Northridge: Center for Geographical Studies, California State University, Northridge.
Sassen S, 1998, "The impact of the new technologies and globalization on cities", in Globalization and the World of Large Cities Eds F-C Lo, Y-M Yeung (United Nations University Press, Tokyo) pp 391 – 411
Soja, Edward W. Postmetropolis: Critical Studies of Cities and Regions. Blackwell Publishing Ltd., 2000  (hc);  (pb)
Wilson, William Julius; The Truly Disadvantaged: The Inner City, the Underclass, and Public Policy, Chicago: University of Chicago Press, 1987

Urban studies and planning terminology